Bahari is a census town in Barpeta district  in the state of Assam, India.

Demographics
 India census, Bohari had a population of 7976. Males constitute 52% of the population and females 48%. Bohari has an average literacy rate of 59%, lower than the national average of 59.5%; with male literacy of 67% and female literacy of 51%. 13% of the population is under 6 years of age.

References

Cities and towns in Barpeta district
Barpeta